The Corpus Fontium Historiae Byzantinae (Latin: "Corpus of Byzantine history sources") or CFHB is an international project aiming to collect, edit and provide textual criticism on the historical sources from the time of the Byzantine Empire (4th–15th centuries AD). Its purpose is to make the works of Byzantine authors, especially those that had previously been unedited, available to modern research in an updated form. The project was undertaken at the 13th International Congress of Byzantine Studies in Oxford in 1966, and is under the auspices Association Internationale des Études Byzantines (AIEB) and its national branches.

Publication series 
Each volume contains comments on the author, the surviving manuscripts as well as a translated and annotated version of the text. The original text is also frequently included, including facsimiles. The CFHB volumes are distinguished, according to their location of publication, in national series:

 Series Atheniensis (Athens)
 Series Berolinensis (Berlin)
 Series Bruxellensis (Brussels)
 Series Italica (Italy)
 Series Parisiensis (Paris)
 Series Thessalonicensis (Thessaloniki)
 Series Vindobonensis (Vienna)
 Series Washingtonensis (Washington D.C., Dumbarton Oaks)

See also 
 Corpus Scriptorum Historiae Byzantinae
 Monumenta Germaniae Historica

External links 
CFHB overview in the Journal of Byzantine Studies (JOEB) / Jahrbuch der Österreichischen Byzantinistik
 Association Internationale des Études Byzantines
 Society for the Promotion of Byzantine Studies

Byzantine studies